"Tea Leaves" is a 1948 song by Ella Fitzgerald, composed by Frank Capano, Max C. Freedman, with lyrics by Morty Berk. The song was covered by many artists including  Keely Smith 1960.

References

1948 songs